This is a list of current and former Roman Catholic churches in the Roman Catholic Diocese of Oakland. The diocese comprises Alameda and Contra Costa Counties in the San Francisco Bay Area. The mother church of the diocese is the Cathedral of Christ the Light in Oakland, California.

Alameda County

Contra Costa County

References

 
Oakland